The D.C. McKay Stakes is a South Australian Jockey Club Group 3 Thoroughbred horse race for horses aged three years old and over, run as a quality handicap over a distance of 1100 metres at Morphettville Racecourse in Adelaide, Australia during the SAJC Autumn Carnival.  Total prize money for the race is A$127,250.

History

The race is named in honour of former SAJC committeeman (elected originally in 1950) and horse owner D.C. McKay.

The race is considered a major prep lead up race for the Group 1 The Goodwood later in the Autumn Carnival.

The following horses have won the D.C. McKay–Goodwood double: 
Grey John (1969), Wise Virgin (1973), Puncheon (1976), Comaida Boy (1979), Lord Galaxy (1986), Boardwalk Angel (1989). 
Bomber Bill has won both races but not in the same year.

The race record time for the current distance is 1:02.10 set by Streetcar Magic in 2011.

Name

1968–1997 - D.C. McKay Stakes
1998–2004 - Honda Stakes
 2005 - Malaysia Airlines Stakes
 2006 - SATAB Have A Go Stakes
2007–2012 - evright.com Stakes
2013 onwards - D.C. McKay Stakes

Distance

1968–1972 - 6 furlongs (~1200 metres)
1973–1979 – 1200 metres
1980 – 1450 metres (race held at Victoria Park)
1981–1984 – 1200 metres
1985–2001 – 1100 metres
2002 – 1000 metres (race held at Victoria Park)
2003 onwards - 1100 metres.

Grade

1968–1979 - Principal Race
1980 onwards - Group 3

Winners

 2022 - Free Of Debt
 2021 - Savatoxl
 2020 - Behemoth
 2019 - Despatch
 2018 - Sprightly Lass
 2017 - Karacatis
 2016 - Super One
 2015 - Thermal Current
 2014 - Essay Raider
 2013 - General Truce
 2012 - Outlandish Lad
 2011 - Streetcar Magic
 2010 - Catapulted
 2009 - I Am Invincible
 2008 - Idalou
 2007 - Here De Angels
 2006 - Shablec
 2005 - Bomber Bill
 2004 - Paraca
 2003 - Super Elegant
 2002 - †Libidinious / Windigo
 2001 - Sudurka
 2000 - Perak Gold
 1999 - Loafer
 1998 - Toledo
 1997 - Clang
 1996 - Dr. Zackary
 1995 - Latin Villa
 1994 - Harkaway
 1993 - Colebrook
 1992 - Scornsome
 1991 - Euclase
 1990 - Medicine Kid
 1989 - Boardwalk Angel
 1988 - Beau George
 1987 - Testimony
 1986 - Lord Galaxy
 1985 - Gold Kildare
 1984 - Fire Stick
 1983 - Penny Edition
 1982 - Peta Gay
 1981 - With Pleasure
 1980 - Ducatoon
 1979 - Comaida Boy
 1978 - Comaida Boy
 1977 - Ardroy
 1976 - Puncheon
 1975 - Miss Lockleys
 1974 - King’s Helmet
 1973 - Wise Virgin
 1972 - Eastern Court
 1971 - King Stephen
 1970 - Extinction
 1969 - Grey John
 1968 - King Stephen

† Dead heat

See also
 List of Australian Group races
 Group races

References

Horse races in Australia
Sport in Adelaide